Tanjungpandan (official writing style) (Jawi: تنجوڠ ڤندن ), is the largest town on the island Belitung in the Indonesian province of Bangka-Belitung, Indonesia. Tanjungpandan is the capital of the Belitung Regency comprising one of the five districts (kecamatan) within that Regency. It covers an area of 378.45 km2 and had a population of 86,487 at the 2010 Census and 103,062 at the 2020 Census.

Demographics

The majority of the people in Tanjungpandan are Hakka Chinese and Malay. The religion of the Malays is predominantly Muslims, while the Chinese are mainly Buddhist, Catholic or Protestant.

Transportation
It has H.A.S. Hanandjoeddin International Airport which serves links to Jakarta, Pangkalpinang and Palembang (via Pangkalpinang).

As of June 2011, the port has 6 shipping terminals:
 International Terminal
 Dry Bulk Terminal
 Liquid Bulk Terminal
 Roll-on Roll-off Ship Terminal, including Cargo Ship
 Domestic Terminal
 Container Terminal

External links

References

Bangka
Regency seats of the Bangka Belitung Islands
Districts of the Bangka Belitung Islands